Fanga (Fängä) is a rural locality (a village) in Kaltyayevsky Selsoviet, Tatyshlinsky District, Bashkortostan, Russia. The population was 2 as of 2010. There is 1 street.

Geography 
Fanga is located 11 km east of Verkhniye Tatyshly (the district's administrative centre) by road. Kaltyayevo is the nearest rural locality.

References 

Rural localities in Tatyshlinsky District